Kuthu is a 2004 Indian Tamil-language masala film directed by A. Venkatesh, starring Silambarasan, Ramya and Kalabhavan Mani. It is a remake of the 2003 Telugu film Dil. The music was composed by Srikanth Deva.

Released on 14 April 2004, it received mixed reviews and was an average hit. The film was later dubbed in Telugu as Dheerudu. Ramya was credited in later Tamil films as Divya Spandana because she disliked the name "Kuthu Ramya" that resulted from the success of this film.

Synopsis
Gurumoorthy "Guru" is a sociable boy from a middle-class family. He lives with his parents- a doting mother and a strict but well-meaning father- and playful maternal uncle. He enrolls at the College of Arts and Sciences, and falls in love with  Anjali, a fellow student, who doesn't reciprocate his affections.

Anjali's father is the rich and powerful gangster Veerabahu, who is extremely protective of his daughter to the point that he brutally beats up a boy at a temple for brushing past her by accident. A misunderstanding results in Guru being beaten up by Veerabahu's men, who suspect that him and Anjali are lovers. After this, he vows to win Anjali's love for real. In due course, she falls in love with him too. How the lovers stand strong in the face of Veerabahu's increasingly desperate attempts to separate them forms the rest of the story.

Cast

Silambarasan as Gurumoorthy a.k.a. Guru
Ramya as Anjali
Kalabhavan Mani as Veerabahu, Anjali's father
Vijayakumar as Guru's father
Karunas as Guru's friend
Livingston as Adhi Kesav, College Principal
Kuyili as Guru's mother
Aishwarya as Meenakshi, Anjali's mother
Kota Srinivasa Rao as Anjali's grandfather
Manorama as Anjali's grandmother
Suman Setty as Ramanathan Jr. (Raja Ramanathan Bahadur's Grandson and a Board Member)
Ramya Krishnan (item number in the song "Pottu Thaakku")
Mumtaj (item number in the song "Otha Viral Kattuna")
Robert as himself (cameo appearance in the song "Pottu Thaakku")
Ashok Raja as himself (cameo appearance in the song "Otha Viral Kattuna")

Production
After Dum which was a remake of Kannada film Appu. Venkatesh and Simbhu decided to collaborate for second time with Kuthu being the remake of successful Telugu film Dil. Kannada actress Divya Spandana made her debut in Tamil with this film under the name "Ramya".

A song was picturised with lead pair in studios with an erected set costing Rs 10 lakhs while another song was shot at Thirumayam Kottai near karaikudi with Ramya Krishnan which took three days to complete. The fight scene was shot at SRM College Grounds for 10 days.

Soundtrack
Srikanth Deva's tunes (he is music director Deva's son) are catchy and familiar. The re-recording especially in stunt sequences is jarring.

References

External links

2004 films
Tamil remakes of Telugu films
2004 action comedy films
2000s Tamil-language films
2000s masala films
Indian action comedy films
Films scored by Srikanth Deva
Films directed by A. Venkatesh (director)
2004 comedy films